2,2-Diphenylpropylamine is a form of diphenylpropylamine.

Amines
Phenyl compounds